Leptonetidae is a relatively primitive family of spiders first described by Eugène Simon in 1890. It is made up of tiny haplogyne spiders, meaning they lack the hardened external female genitalia. Their six eyes are arranged in a semicircle of four in front and two behind. Many live in caves or in leaf litter around the Mediterranean, and in Eurasia, Japan and southern North America.

Genera

, the World Spider Catalog accepted the following genera:

Appaleptoneta Platnick, 1986 — United States
Barusia Kratochvíl, 1978 — Montenegro, Croatia, Greece
Calileptoneta Platnick, 1986 — United States
Cataleptoneta Denis, 1955 — Asia, Europe
Chisoneta Ledford & Griswold, 2011 — United States, Mexico
Falcileptoneta Komatsu, 1970 — Japan, Korea
Jingneta Wang & Li, 2020
Leptoneta Simon, 1872 — Europe, Asia, Algeria
Leptonetela Kratochvíl, 1978 — Greece, Asia
Longileptoneta Seo, 2015 — Korea
Masirana Kishida, 1942 — Japan, Korea
Montanineta Ledford & Griswold, 2011 — United States
Neoleptoneta Brignoli, 1972 — Mexico
Ozarkia Ledford & Griswold, 2011 — United States
Paraleptoneta Fage, 1913 — Algeria, Italy
Protoleptoneta Deltshev, 1972 — Europe
Rhyssoleptoneta Tong & Li, 2007 — China
Sulcia Kratochvíl, 1938 — Europe
Tayshaneta Ledford & Griswold, 2011 — United States
Teloleptoneta Ribera, 1988 — Portugal
Yueleptoneta Tong, 2022

Two genera have been moved to the family Archoleptonetidae:
Archoleptoneta Gertsch, 1974 — United States
Darkoneta Ledford & Griswold, 2010 — North America, Central America

See also
 List of Leptonetidae species

References

Further reading
 Gertsch, W.J. (1978). The spider family Leptonetidae in North America. Journal of Arachnology 1:145-203. PDF
 Platnick, N.I. (1986). On the tibial and patellar glands, relationships, and American genera of the spider family Leptonetidae (Arachnida, Araneae). American Museum Novitates 2855. PDF

External links
Arachnology Home Pages: Araneae
Platnick, N.I. 2003. World Spider Catalog
 

 
Araneomorphae families